Scott William Wilson (born 20 April 1982 in Bellshill), is a Scottish footballer who plays for Glenafton Athletic.

Career

Wilson began his career with Motherwell, but was released along with 19 others when the club went into administration. 
Wilson went on to sign for Airdrie United, making 39 appearances for the Diamonds before joining Clyde in 2004.

He then had a 6-month spell with Raith Rovers, which was blighted by injury, before joining Brechin City. He played for Stranraer for the 2007–08 season, before dropping out of the senior game to join Linlithgow Rose.

On 14 January 2011 he left Linlithgow Rose. He then joined Glenafton Athletic.

See also
Clyde F.C. season 2004-05

References

External links

Living people
1982 births
Footballers from Bellshill
Scottish footballers
Motherwell F.C. players
Airdrieonians F.C. players
Clyde F.C. players
Raith Rovers F.C. players
Brechin City F.C. players
Stranraer F.C. players
Scottish Football League players
Scottish Junior Football Association players
Glenafton Athletic F.C. players
Linlithgow Rose F.C. players
Association football defenders